In statistical mechanics and thermodynamics the compressibility equation refers to an equation which relates the isothermal compressibility (and indirectly the pressure) to the structure of the liquid.

Using the Fourier representation of the Ornstein-Zernike equation the compressibility equation can be rewritten in the form:

where h(r) and c(r) are the indirect and direct correlation functions respectively. The compressibility equation is one of the many integral equations in statistical mechanics.

References 

D.A. McQuarrie, Statistical Mechanics (Harper Collins Publishers) 1976

Statistical mechanics
Thermodynamic equations